John Thomas Duren (born October 30, 1958) is an American retired professional basketball player. He was a 6'3" (191 cm) 195 lb (89 kg) point guard and played collegiately at Georgetown University from 1976 to 1980.

Duren was selected with the 19th overall pick in the 1980 NBA Draft by the Utah Jazz. He played for the Jazz for two seasons before signing as a free agent for the Indiana Pacers for 1982–83, his final NBA season.

Notes

External links
NBA stats @ basketballreference.com

1958 births
Living people
African-American basketball players
American men's basketball players
Basketball players at the 1979 Pan American Games
Basketball players from Washington, D.C.
Dunbar High School (Washington, D.C.) alumni
Georgetown Hoyas men's basketball players
Indiana Pacers players
Lancaster Lightning players
Pan American Games gold medalists for the United States
Pan American Games medalists in basketball
Point guards
Utah Jazz players
Utah Jazz draft picks
Medalists at the 1979 Pan American Games
21st-century African-American people
20th-century African-American sportspeople